Lasbid (also Romanized as Lasbīd and Lāsbīd; also known as Lāspīd) is a village in Howmeh Rural District, in the Central District of Behbahan County, Khuzestan Province, Iran. At the 2006 census, its population was 169, in 30 families.

References 

Populated places in Behbahan County